Gonichthys is a genus of lanternfishes.

Species
There are four recognized species in this genus:
 Gonichthys barnesi Whitley, 1943 (Barnes's lanternfish)
 Gonichthys cocco (Cocco, 1829)
 Gonichthys tenuiculus (Garman, 1899) (slendertail lanternfish)
 Gonichthys venetus Becker, 1964

References

Myctophidae
Marine fish genera
Taxa named by Johannes von Nepomuk Franz Xaver Gistel